Coccolepididae is an extinct family of ray-finned fish, known from the Early Jurassic to Early Cretaceous, most of which were originally referred to the type genus Coccolepis. They had a widespread distribution, being found in North and South America, Australia, Asia and Europe. They are mostly known from freshwater environments, though several species have been found in marine environments. They are morphologically conservative, and have poorly ossified endo and exoskeletons, which usually results in poor preservation. This makes it difficult to distinguish species. They are generally small fish, with the largest known specimens reaching a length of 210 mm. Historically, they have been classified as members of “Palaeonisciformes”, a paraphyletic grouping of non-neopterygian fish, due to their plesiomorphic conservative morphology closely resembling those of many other groups of primitive fish. They have been suggested to be relatives of the Acipenseriformes within the Chondrostei.

Taxonomy 
After

 Coccolepis Agassiz, 1843 Solnhofen Limestone, Germany, Late Jurassic (Tithonian)
 Coccolepis bucklandi Agassiz, 1843
 Coccolepis solnhofensis López-Arbarello, and Ebert, 2021
 "Coccolepis" liassica Woodward, 1890 Blue Lias or Charmouth Mudstone Formation, England, Early Jurassic (Sinemurian)
 "Coccolepis" australis Woodward, 1895 Talbragar Fossil Beds, Australia, Late Jurassic (Tithonian)
 Morrolepis Kirkland, 1998
 M. schaefferi Kirkland, 1998 Morrison Formation, United States Late Jurassic (Tithonian)
 M. aniscowitchi (Gorizdro-Kulczycka), 1926 Karabastau Formation, Kazakhstan, Middle-Late Jurassic (Callovian/Oxfordian)
 M. andrewsi (Woodward, 1891) Purbeck Group, United Kingdom, Early Cretaceous (Berriasian)
 Barbalepis Olive, Taverne, and López-Arbarello, 2019 Sainte-Barbe Clays Formation, Belgium, Early Cretaceous (Barremian/Aptian) formerly Coccolepis macroptera Traquair, 1911
 Condorlepis López-Arbarello, Sferco, and Rauhut, 2013
 Condorlepis groeberi (Bordas, 1943) Cañadón Calcáreo Formation, Argentina, Upper Jurassic
 Condorlepis woodwardi (Waldman, 1971) Koonwarra fossil bed, Australia, Early Cretaceous (Aptian) 
 Iyalepis Sytchevskaya, 2006 Cheremkhovskaya Formation, Russia, Early Jurassic (Toarcian) formerly Angaraichthys rohoni Sytchevskaya and Yakovlev, 1985
 Plesiococcolepis Wang, 1977 Lingling-Hengyang, Hunan, China, Early Jurassic
 Plesiococcolepis hunanensis Wang, 1977
 Sunolepis Liu, 1957 Yumen, Gansu Province, China, Upper Jurassic or Lower Cretaceous
 Sunolepis yumenensis Liu, 1957

References

Prehistoric chondrostei
Prehistoric ray-finned fish families